Justin Hamilton (born July 27, 1993) is an American football defensive tackle. He played college football at Louisiana. Hamilton signed with the Green Bay Packers as an undrafted free agent in 2015 and has also been a member of several other NFL teams.

Early years
Hamilton attended Natchez High School in Natchez, Mississippi where he was a two-way tackle. As a junior, he received All-metro honors. As a senior, he tallied  40 tackles, 4 sacks, 4 tackles for loss, 5 quarterback hurries, 2 forced fumbles and one fumble recovery, while receiving All-state honors. He committed to the University of Louisiana at Lafayette.

College career
As a true freshman, he was a backup defensive tackle, making 8 tackles (6 solo) and 2 sacks.

As a sophomore, he started 11 out of 12 games. He was suspended by the Sun Belt Conference for the third game against Oklahoma State University. He came off the bench in the eighth game against the University of Louisiana at Monroe, when the team employed a dime defense. He registered 29 tackles (18 solo), 3 sacks, 8 tackles for loss and 3 forced fumbles.

As a junior, he was slowed by an off-season leg injury and did not regain his full strength until mid-season. He started the last 12 games at nose tackle, collecting 39 tackles (24 solo), 4 sacks, 9 tackles for loss, one forced fumble and one fumble recovery.

As a senior, he posted 27 tackles (23 solo), 5 sacks, 10 tackles for loss and one fumble recovery. He was named first-team All-Sun Belt Conference. He finished his college career after appearing in 51 games, recording 102 tackles (71 solo), 14 sacks, 29 tackles for loss and 4 forced fumbles.

Professional career

Buffalo Bills
Hamilton was signed as an undrafted free agent by the Buffalo Bills after the 2015 NFL Draft on May 3. On August 31, he was waived as part of the Bills trimming their roster to 75.

Green Bay Packers
On October 26, 2015, Hamilton was signed by the Green Bay Packers to their practice squad. On November 10, he was waived from the practice squad to make room for Eric Crume.

Seattle Seahawks
On November 17, 2015, Hamilton was signed by the Seattle Seahawks to their practice squad. On November 26, Hamilton was waived by the Seahawks. On December 1, he was re-signed to the Seattle Seahawks practice squad. On December 15, Hamilton was again waived by the Seahawks. The following day Hamilton found himself back on the practice squad. On December 22, he was waived from the practice squad. On December 30, the Seahawks signed Hamilton back to the practice squad. On January 19, 2016, Hamilton signed a futures contract with the Seattle Seahawks.

On September 5, 2016, Hamilton was waived by the Seahawks and was signed to the practice squad the next day. On September 13, he was released from the Seahawks' practice squad. He was re-signed to the practice squad on October 25.

Philadelphia Eagles
On January 23, 2017, Hamilton signed a futures contract with the Eagles. He was waived on September 2, and was signed to the Eagles' practice squad the next day. He was released on September 16, but was re-signed two days later. He was promoted to the active roster on September 30. He made his NFL debut in the fourth game against the San Diego Chargers. He appeared in 3 games, tallying 2 tackles and 0.5 sacks. He was waived by the Eagles on November 1, and re-signed to the practice squad.

Kansas City Chiefs
On December 7, 2017, Hamilton was signed by the Kansas City Chiefs off the Eagles' practice squad. He started in the season finale against the Denver Broncos.

In 2018, he was declared inactive in 12 games. He appeared in the last 4 contests as a backup. On August 31, 2019, Hamilton was released by the Chiefs.

Dallas Cowboys
On October 16, 2019, Hamilton was signed by the Dallas Cowboys to replace an injured Tyrone Crawford. On October 25, he was released after the team obtained defensive end Michael Bennett in a trade. He signed a reserve/future contract with the Cowboys on January 21, 2020.

On September 5, 2020, Hamilton was waived by the Cowboys and signed to the practice squad the next day. On October 19, he was promoted to the active roster. He was placed on the reserve/COVID-19 list by the team on January 1, 2021, and activated on February 1, 2021.

On August 31, 2021, Hamilton was released by the Cowboys and re-signed to the practice squad the next day. He was promoted to the active roster on November 6. He was waived on December 11 and re-signed to the practice squad.  He was promoted to the active roster on December 18.

Denver Broncos
On December 28, 2021, Hamilton was signed by the Denver Broncos off the Cowboys practice squad.

Washington Commanders
Hamilton signed with the Washington Commanders on June 14, 2022. He was released on August 30.

Personal life
Hamilton was born to Michael and Clementine Hamilton, and is the youngest of four siblings. He married Jasmine Davis and they have one daughter and one son together.

References

External links
Louisiana-Lafayette Ragin' Cajuns bio

1993 births
Living people
Players of American football from Mississippi
Sportspeople from Natchez, Mississippi
American football defensive tackles
Louisiana Ragin' Cajuns football players
Buffalo Bills players
Green Bay Packers players
Seattle Seahawks players
Philadelphia Eagles players
Kansas City Chiefs players
Dallas Cowboys players
Denver Broncos players
Washington Commanders players